Sir George Bingham, 2nd Baronet (c. 1625 – 1682) was an Irish politician and baronet.

He was the only son of Sir Henry Bingham, 1st Baronet and his wife Catherine Byrne, daughter of John Byrne. In 1658, Bingham succeeded his father as baronet. He entered the Irish House of Commons for Castlebar in 1661, representing the constituency until 1666. Bingham was appointed High Sheriff of Mayo in 1662 and again in 1678. In 1663, he became Custos Rotulorum of Mayo.

Family
Bingham married firstly Anne Partiger, 1 June 1661 at St. Benet's, Paul's Wharf, London, and had a son Henry. Anne died c. 1661.
Bingham married secondly Rebecca Middleton, daughter of Sir William Middleton, 2nd Baronet, and Eleanor Harris on 5 December 1661. and had a child George. He was succeeded in the baronetcy successively by his sons Henry and George.

References

1620s births
1682 deaths
Politicians from County Mayo
Bingham Baronets, of Castlebar
Members of the Parliament of Ireland (pre-1801) for County Mayo constituencies
High Sheriffs of Mayo
Irish MPs 1661–1666